Dominic Revan (born 19 September 2000) is an English footballer who plays as a defender for National League team Barnet. Revan is a product of the Aston Villa Academy.

Early life
Revan was born in West Bromwich. He joined the Aston Villa youth academy at the age of 8. His brother, Sebastian is also part of the Aston Villa academy.

Career

Aston Villa 
Revan was named in the Aston Villa starting line-up for his senior debut on 8 January 2021 in an FA Cup third round tie against Liverpool.

On 15 January 2021, Revan joined Weymouth of the National League on loan for the rest of the season. The following day, Revan made his Weymouth debut in a 1–0 home defeat to Darlington in the FA Trophy. On 10 April 2021, Revan suffered a broken jaw in a National League match against Torquay United. On 26 April, the injury led to his loan spell being cut short and Revan returned to Aston Villa.

On 31 August 2021, Revan joined League Two side Northampton Town on loan until January 2022. He made six appearances in an injury-hit loan spell, before returning to Aston Villa.

On 10 June 2022, Revan was released by Aston Villa.

Barnet 
On 2 September 2022, Revan signed for National League club Barnet. He made his debut in a 3–1 defeat to Aldershot Town the following day. Revan scored his first goal in senior football on 15 October 2022, in a 3–0 victory over Weston-super-Mare in the FA Cup.

Career statistics

Honours 
Aston Villa U23s

 Premier League Cup: 2017–18

References

2000 births
Living people
English footballers
Association football defenders
Sportspeople from West Bromwich
Black British sportspeople
Aston Villa F.C. players
Weymouth F.C. players
Northampton Town F.C. players
Barnet F.C. players
National League (English football) players
English Football League players